King Ludd may refer to:

Lud son of Heli, legendary 1st-century BCE founder of London
Ned Ludd, leader of the 19th-century Luddites